KHDT-LD, virtual channel 26 (VHF digital channel 10), is a low-powered Movies!-affiliated television station licensed to Denver, Colorado, United States. The station is owned by Syncom Media Group.

Digital channels

The station's digital signal is multiplexed:

References

External links

HDT-LD
Low-power television stations in the United States
Movies! affiliates
Heroes & Icons affiliates
Decades (TV network) affiliates